KHPN may refer to:

 Westchester County Airport (ICAO code KHPN)
 KHPN-LD, a low-power television station (channel 22, virtual 51) licensed to serve Warrenton, Oregon, United States